Greek salad or horiatiki salad ( or ) is a popular salad in Greek cuisine generally made with pieces of tomatoes, cucumbers, onion, feta cheese (usually served as a slice on top of the other ingredients), and olives (typically Kalamata olives) and dressed with salt, Greek oregano, and olive oil. Common additions include green bell pepper slices or caper berries (especially on the Dodecanese islands). Greek salad is often imagined as a farmer's breakfast or lunch, as its ingredients resemble those that a Greek farmer might have on hand.

Outside Greece 

Outside Greece, "Greek salad" may be a lettuce salad with Greek-inspired ingredients, even though the original dish is distinguished by the absence of lettuce. Meanwhile, the variant without lettuce may be called , 'peasant salad', or 'village salad'.

However in most European countries, including the UK, the dish broadly resembles the original, albeit often with non-Greek substitutions such as another cheese since feta cheese enjoys protected designation of origin status.

In an American-style Greek salad, lettuce, tomatoes, feta (often served in multiple cube-shaped cuttings mixed with the vegetables), and olives are the most standard elements, but cucumbers, peperoncini (pickled hot peppers), bell peppers, onions, radishes, dolmades, and anchovies/sardines are common. Regional variants may include unusual components, e.g. in Detroit, beets, and in the Tampa Bay Area, potato salad. Dressings containing various herbs and seasonings are frequently used in the U.S. These styles of Greek salad are rarely encountered in Greece.

Various other salads have also been called "Greek" in the English language in the last century, including some with no apparent connection to Greek cuisine. A 1925 Australian newspaper described a Greek salad of boiled squash dressed with sour milk; a 1934 American newspaper described a mayonnaise-dressed lettuce salad with shredded cabbage and carrots.

Other salads in Greece and Cyprus 

There are many other salads in Greek cuisine. These include:

  (a salad with lettuce, onion and dill)
  (a shredded fresh cabbage salad  dressed with olive oil, lemon juice, and garlic)
  (boiled and sliced beetroots, sometimes with beet greens as well, dressed with olive oil and red wine vinegar)
  (rocket (arugula) dressed with olive oil and red wine vinegar or lemon juice, possibly including anchovies)
  (a potato salad with olive oil, finely sliced onions, lemon juice or vinegar)
  (a chickpea salad)
  (a parsley salad usually used as a condiment)
 Cypriot salad, native to the island of Cyprus, consists of finely chopped tomatoes, capers, cucumbers, onions, flat-leaf parsley, feta cheese, dressed with olive oil and lemon or red wine vinegar, and closely resembles the "Greek salad" of Greece.

Some spreads and dips found in the meze of Greek cuisine are also called "salads" in Greek, such as melitzanosalata, taramasalata and tzatziki.

Gallery

See also 

Shopska salad, a similar salad from Bulgaria
Çoban salatası, a similar salad from Turkey
Serbian salad, a similar salad from Serbia
Israeli salad, a similar salad from Israel
Arab salad, a similar salad from the Arab world
King's Hand, a novelty dish including Greek salad

References 

Cypriot cuisine
Greek cuisine
Salads
Vegetable dishes
Greek inventions
Olive dishes